Standard is an unincorporated community in Vernon Parish, Louisiana, United States.

Notes

Unincorporated communities in Vernon Parish, Louisiana
Unincorporated communities in Louisiana